The United Association for Studies and Research (UASR) was founded in 1989 in Chicago.  The group states that it has a commitment to “the study of ongoing issues in the Middle East, such as the Arab-Israeli conflict”.  The group has been described as a front operation for Hamas. UASR was founded by Mousa Abu Marzook who was a known Hamas operative.

Leadership
Marzook was the head of the Hamas political bureau beginning in 1988.  Marzook was listed as a Specially Designated Terrorist by the U.S. Treasury in 1995.  He was later arrested in New York in 1995 for his role in supporting the Hamas network in the United States.  Marzook also founded the Holy Land Foundation, which was the subject of one of the country's largest and most successful terrorist financing trials. In 1997, he was extradited by the United States to Jordan.  He later went from Jordan to Syria to serve as the Deputy Chief of Hamas's Political Bureau.  He is currently listed under Treasury's Specially Designated National list.

In 1998, Dr. Laura Drake served as the director of UASR.  Previously she served as the Director of Research at the Council for the National Interest (CNI), an organization that has multiple ties to individuals involved in Hamas and the Muslim Brotherhood.

Ahmad Yousef served as the Executive Director of UASR and also as the editor of its quarterly journal, The Middle East Affairs Journal. Through UASR, Yousef published a tribute to Hamas founder and leader Ahmed Yassin called Ahmed Yassin: The Phenomenon, the Miracle, and the Legend of the Challenge. He later became a personal advisor to Ismail Haniyeh, a Hamas leader in Gaza. Shortly after, he published a book in English called The End of the Jewish State: Just a Matter of Time.

Controversy
In a 1993 New York Times article, Muhammad Salah, a Hamas terrorist convicted in Israel, stated that the political command of Hamas in the U.S. was the UASR.  He also named Ahmad Yousef as the director of UASR and Mousa Abu Marzook as the political chief.  Muhammad Salah's arrest was a turning point in the investigation into Hamas as his interrogations, along with others, provided valuable information about Marzook and the U.S. Hamas network, including the role of UASR in this network.

As early as 2000, the think tank was based in Springfield, Virginia.  In 2003 they began operating out of a basement apartment.  At this time, government investigators began to point to shady actions that added to their suspicions that the group was involved in terrorist activities.  The windows of the apartment were covered with fake brick contact paper to prevent people from seeing in, and employees were rarely seen.  It was also suspected that they were using prepaid disposable cell phones for phone calls, making wire taps impossible.

Also in 2003, the Senate Finance Committee asked the Internal Revenue Service to provide its records on UASR and other Muslim groups as part of their investigation into non-governmental organizations and terrorist networks in the United States.

Council on American-Islamic Relations
There are several former Council on American-Islamic Relations (CAIR) leaders with links to UASR. Nabil Sadoun was CAIR's former Vice Chairman who was deported in February 2010 after not disclosing his ties to UASR in his 1993 visa application.

Mohamed Nimer, was CAIR's director of research from 1995-2007. He worked for UASR in the early 1990s, and around the same time in 1993 spent a month in Lebanon at a camp of Hamas activists that had been deported by Israel.

Caroline F. Keeble (aka Anisa Abd el Fattah) served in several different roles at UASR during the 1990s until March 2004. Her positions included president and director of public relations and media affairs. In February 2000, UASR published a report called “Islam and America: A New Reading”. Keeble praised Hamas as a resistance movement. This report listed Keeble as a member of the Board of Directors of both UASR and CAIR.

References 

Think tanks based in the United States